Velcro, officially known as Velcro IP Holdings LLC and trading as Velcro Companies, is a British privately held company, founded by Swiss electrical engineer George de Mestral in the 1950s. It is the original manufacturer of hook-and-loop fasteners, which de Mestral invented.

History

Swiss electrical engineer George de Mestral invented his first touch fastener when, in 1941, he went for a walk in the Alps, and wondered why burdock seeds clung to his woolen socks and coat, and also his dog Milka. He discovered it could be turned into something useful. He patented it in 1955, and subsequently refined and developed its practical manufacture until its commercial introduction in the late 1950s.

The fastener consisted of two components: a lineal fabric strip with tiny hooks that could 'mate' with another fabric strip with smaller loops, attaching temporarily, until pulled apart. Initially made of cotton, which proved impractical, the fastener was eventually constructed with nylon and polyester.

De Mestral named Velcro; a portmanteau of the French words velours ('velvet') and crochet ('hook'), to his invention, as well as to the Swiss company he founded; Velcro SA.

The company continues to manufacture and market the fastening system. Originally envisioned as a fastener for clothing, today, Velcro is used across a wide array of industries and applications; including healthcare, the military, land vehicles, aircraft, and even spacecraft.

References

External links

 
 Original 1955 patent — from Google Patents

1952 establishments in Switzerland
Brands that became generic
Privately held companies of the United Kingdom